Hours is the second album by Welsh post-hardcore band Funeral for a Friend. The album was released on 13 June 2005, through record labels Atlantic and Ferret.

Four singles were released from the album: "Streetcar", "Monsters", "History" and "Roses for the Dead".

Production 
Hours was produced, recorded and mixed by Terry Date, with co-production by the band. Production took place in Seattle, Washington, with some of the album being recorded in Pearl Jam’s Studio Litho facilities. Several unorthodox approaches were taken during vocal tracking, including Date recording Davies-Kreye singing on a public street ("History") and in a moving vehicle ("Drive").

Release 

Hours was released on 13 June 2005. The album reached number 12 in the UK Albums Chart and was their first album to appear on the US Billboard 200, reaching number 139.

The album produced four singles: "Streetcar", "Monsters", "History" and "Roses for the Dead", all of which charted within the UK top 50.

The album has been released in four versions: standard edition; special edition, with a bonus DVD containing interviews with the band and fans before the band's gig at the Give it a Name festival, and different cover; Japanese edition, with two bonus tracks; and limited Japanese edition with six bonus tracks.

Track listing
All songs written by Funeral for a Friend

Personnel 
Funeral for a Friend

Kris Coombs-Roberts – guitar, backing vocals, co-production
Gareth Davies – bass guitar, backing vocals, co-production
Matt Davies – vocals, co-production
Ryan Richards – drums, percussion, unclean vocals, co-production
Darran Smith – guitar, co-production

 Additional personnel

 Kate Hamilton – phone vocals on "Streetcar"
 Storme, Lisa and Joel – additional vocals on "Streetcar"
 Brian Valentino – additional vocals on "History"
 Josh Evans – addition vocals on "History"
 Terry Date – production, recording, mixing
 Sam Hofstedt – assisted engineering at Studio X
 Floyd Reitsma – assisted engineering at Studio Litho
 Junichi Murakawa – mixing at Bay 7, Los Angeles, California
 Ted Jensen – mastering at Sterling Sound, New York City
 John Mitchell – recording of phone vocals at Outhouse Studios, Reading, Berkshire

Charts

Album

Singles

References

External links 

 

2005 albums
Funeral for a Friend albums
Atlantic Records albums
Albums produced by Terry Date